Lilium monadelphum is a bulbous plant native to Crimea and to North and South Caucasus.

Description
Lilium monadelphum grows from 0.5 to 2 metres (1.5 to 6 feet) tall. The flowers have reflexed tepals (tepals bent backward), in banana yellow with purple spots.

formerly included
 Lilium monadelphum subsp. armenum, now called Lilium armenum  
 Lilium monadelphum var. ledebourii, now called  Lilium ledebourii  
 Lilium monadelphum var. szovitsianum, now called  Lilium szovitsianum

References

External links
Pacific Bulb Society, Lilium Candidum Section color photos of several species including Lilium monadelphum
Magnar's arctic alpines & perennials, Lilium monadelphum in Norwegian with color photo
Missouri Botanical Garden, Rare, Endangered and Vulnerable Plants of the Republic of Georgia, Lilium monadelphum 

monadelphum
Flora of the Caucasus
Flora of the Crimean Peninsula
Plants described in 1808